Paralympic Council of Malaysia, (PCM or MPM) is the National Paralympic Committee (NPC) of Malaysia. The council was established on 18 May 1989 as the Malaysian Disabled Sports Council (Majlis Sukan Orang Cacat Malaysia). In 1996, it was renamed as Malaysian Paralympic Council and later as Paralympic Council of Malaysia. The Paralympic Council of Malaysia is currently headquartered at the Malaysia Paralympic Sports Excellence Centre (MPSEC or PKSPM).

List of Presidents 
1991-2003: Fauzi Abdul Rahman
2005-2015: Zainal Abu Zarin
2015-2019: SM Nasarudin SM Nasimuddin
2019-Present: Megat D Shahriman Zaharudin

See also 
Malaysian achievements in Para Sports:
 Malaysia at the Paralympics
 Malaysia at the Asian Para Games
 Malaysia at the ASEAN Para Games
Olympic Counterpart:
 Olympic Council of Malaysia

References

National Paralympic Committees
Paralympic
1989 establishments in Malaysia
Sports organizations established in 1989
Disability organisations based in Malaysia